Against the Day is a 1999 historical novel by Michael Cronin. The story is set after the end of World War II in a United Kingdom that has fallen under Nazi occupation. It follows the adventures of two boys who become dangerously involved in a secret resistance movement. A sequel, Through the Night, was published in 2003. A third book in the series, In the Morning, was published in 2005. It was shortlisted for the Angus Book Award.

References

1999 novels
Alternate Nazi Germany novels